A jelly bean is a type of confectionery.

Jelly bean or Jellybean may also refer to:

Arts, entertainment, and media
 Assorted Jelly Beans, American punk rock group
 The Jelly Beans, American vocal group
 "The Jelly-bean" (1920), short story of Francis Scott Fitzgerald

Biology
 Jelly bean palm or Synechanthus, a genus of flowering plant in the palm family
 Jelly bean plant or Sedum rubrotinctum, a succulent plant from the family Crassulaceae
 Jellybean tetra or Ladigesia roloffi, a species of African tetra
 Jellybean tetra or Adonis tetra (Lepidarchus adonis), a very small African fish of the family Alestidae

People
 Jellybean Johnson (born 1956), an American musician and member of The Time
 Joe "Jellybean" Bryant (born 1954), an American basketball player and coach
 John "Jellybean" Benitez (born 1957), an American musician, producer and DJ, often credited simply as Jellybean
 The "Jelly bean lady", Loretta Marron (born 1951), the CEO of Friends of Science in Medicine

Other uses
 Android Jelly Bean, codename for versions 4.1–4.3 of the Android operating system
 Jellybean Jones, a member of the Jones family in the Archies Gang comics
 In the electronics industry, a "jelly bean" component is one which is widely available, used generically in many applications, and has no very unusual characteristics. For example, the μA741 might be considered a jelly bean operational amplifier.

See also
 Jelly roll (disambiguation)